Jonathan Croall (born 19 August 1941) is a British author and journalist.

Croall was brought up in Battersea in south London: his father was the film and stage actor John Stuart, his mother the actress, teacher and voice coach Barbara Francis. He was educated at St Christopher School, a progressive school in Letchworth, Hertfordshire (1949–1959), and at St John's College, Cambridge, where he studied English literature and modern languages (1960–1963).

After teaching English at the Lycée Jean-Baptiste-Say in Paris, he worked as an editor in publishing with Cassell, Penguin, Oxford University Press, and Writers and Readers; later he was managing editor of Bedford Square Press.

He subsequently worked as an editor and a journalist in newspapers and magazines. He was successively features editor of the Times Educational Supplement; co-founder and editor of Arts Express magazine; editor of StageWrite, the magazine of the National Theatre; and programme editor at the Old Vic theatre. During this time he wrote about education, the arts, health, history, and the environment for The Guardian, the Daily Telegraph, the Sunday Times, New Society and Vole magazine.

He is the author of twenty books, most notably biographies of AS Neill, John Gielgud and Sybil Thorndike, and books about productions of Hamlet, Bacchai and Mother Clap's Molly House at the National Theatre in Britain. The Coming of Godot: A Short History of a Masterpiece was nominated for the 2005 Theatre Book Prize. He adapted and directed for the stage his oral history Don't You Know There's a War On? His children's novel Sent Away was based on the true story of the child migrant scandal. His latest work is Forgotten Stars: My Father and the British Silent Film World.

His eldest son Ben Croall is a music journalist who writes under the name Carl Loben; his youngest son Julius Croall is a musician and guitar teacher. His partner is the playwright Lesley Bruce.

Publications 
 Performing Hamlet: Actors in the Modern Age, London: Bloomsbury Publishing 2018 
 Editor, This Once Was Us: The Life and Death of Penguin Education, Penguin Collectors Society 2018 
 
 
 
 
 
 
 
 
  (with foreword by Peter Hall)
 
  (preface by Peter Hall)

References 

1941 births
Living people
People from Amersham
Alumni of St John's College, Cambridge
British biographers
British male journalists
Male biographers